Eigil Kragh Christiansen (16 May 1894 – 12 June 1943) was a Norwegian sailor. He was born in Brevik, and was the son of Hans Christiansen. He competed in the 6 metre class at the 1912 Summer Olympics in Stockholm, placing tied fifth, together with his father and Edvart Christensen on the boat Sonja II.

References

1894 births
1943 deaths
People from Telemark
Norwegian male sailors (sport)
Sailors at the 1912 Summer Olympics – 6 Metre
Olympic sailors of Norway
Sportspeople from Vestfold og Telemark